Sisters (stylized as SISTERS) is the fourth full-length studio album by Japanese idol group Idoling!!!. It reached number 17 on Oricon chart.
The song "Makehende" used as Fuji TV "Wakeari Nē-san EX" ending song.

Contents
Sisters released in three types:
 Limited A-type (CD and DVD)
 Limited B-type (CD and Photobook)
 Normal Type (CD only)

Track listing

CD

DVD
 Liner Notes-ng 2011

Notes
 "Haruiro no Sora" sung by #6 Erica Tonooka, #21 Kaede Hashimoto, and #23 Yuna Itō.
 "4U" sung by #6 Erica Tonooka and #9 Rurika Yokoyama.
 "Makehende" sung by Kansai Idoling!!!, a special six members sub-group which all members were born in Kansai region. They are #11 Suzuka Morita (Kyoto), #19 Yurika Tachibana (Shiga), #20 Ai Ōkawa (Hyogo), #22 Ruka Kurata (Osaka), and #24 Manami Nomoto (Osaka). The song included on the album as a gift after the song breached the top 50 on USEN ranking. A special music video was created after the song managed to breach the top 30.

References

External links 
  - Fuji TV
  - Pony Canyon
 Pony Canyon website
 Avex Management Creator Division

2011 albums
Pony Canyon albums
Idoling!!! albums